Karen Amanda Yeats (born 1980) is a Canadian mathematician and mathematical physicist whose research connects combinatorics to quantum field theory. She holds the Canada Research Chair in Combinatorics in Quantum Field Theory at the University of Waterloo.

Biography
Yeats is from Halifax, Nova Scotia. As an undergraduate at the University of Waterloo, she won an honourable mention for the 2003 Morgan Prize for her research in number theory, the theory of Lie groups, and non-standard models of arithmetic. She graduated in 2003, and went to Boston University for graduate school, where she completed her Ph.D. in 2008. Her dissertation, Growth Estimates for Dyson-Schwinger Equations, was supervised by Dirk Kreimer. In 2016 she was awarded a Humboldt Fellowship to visit Kreimer at the Humboldt University of Berlin.

Yeats is the author of the books Rearranging Dyson–Schwinger Equations (Memoirs of the American Mathematical Society, 2011)
and A Combinatorial Perspective on Quantum Field Theory (Springer, 2017).

References

External links

Home page

1980 births
Living people
Canadian mathematicians
Canadian physicists
Women mathematicians
Canadian women physicists
Combinatorialists
Quantum physicists
University of Waterloo alumni
Boston University alumni
Academic staff of the University of Waterloo